Fabio Ochoa Vásquez (born  May 2, 1957) is a former leading member of the Medellín cocaine trafficking cartel, along with his older brothers Juan David and Jorge Luis. His role briefly made him a billionaire. After serving a brief prison term in Colombia, he was arrested and extradited to the US in 1999 and is serving a 30-year term in US federal prison.

Early career 
The youngest of the three Ochoa brothers, Ochoa Vásquez lived in Miami, Florida during the 1970s and early 1980s, and was alleged to have handled thousands of pounds of cocaine. He was indicted by the US government for the first time in 1984, and was allegedly involved in the February 19, 1986 murder of Barry Seal, an informant for the U.S. Drug Enforcement Administration. In 1987, he and his brothers were included in the Forbes Magazine list of global billionaires, and remained on the list until 1992. The New York Times reported that during this period he was considered the "chief executive" of the family business.

Imprisonment 
In 1991, Ochoa Vásquez and his brothers turned themselves in to Colombian authorities, hoping to avoid "open war" with the government through a plea deal. They served short terms together in Colombia, and were released by 1996. At the time, Colombia and the US did not have an extradition treaty, and the brothers secured a promise that they would not be extradited in the future as part of the plea deal.

After release, he was arrested again in 1999, and accused of contributing knowledge and receiving payments for cocaine shipments. Despite a lobbying and press campaign, he was extradited to the United States in September 2001, and convicted in 2003 of trafficking, conspiracy and distribution of cocaine in the U.S. He was sentenced to 30 years in a U.S. federal prison. He is now in federal prison in Jesup, GA.

After his imprisonment, the Colombian government seized properties worth several million US dollars from him, including several farms and businesses. On May 1, 2020, U.S. federal prosecutors objected to a bid for Ochoa Vásquez to be released five years before the completion of his 30 year prison sentence.

Television
Ochoa Vásquez has been represented in three television series.
The character of Julio Motoa in the Colombian TV series Pablo Escobar: El Patrón del Mal is based on Ochoa Vazquez. Motoa is played by Aldemar Correa.
Ochoa Vásquez is a character on the Netflix series Narcos, portrayed by Roberto Urbina.
 Fabio Ochoa is portrayed by Gael García Bernal in TV Series Alias El Mexicano.

See also

Cocaine Cowboys
Griselda Blanco
War on Drugs

Notes

Ochoa Vazquez, Fabio
Colombian drug traffickers
Colombian people imprisoned abroad
Prisoners and detainees of the United States federal government
Living people
1957 births
People extradited from Mexico to the United States
People from Medellín